Zayar is a rural locality (a khutor) in Krasnoye Rural Settlement, Sredneakhtubinsky District, Volgograd Oblast, Russia. The population was 147 as of 2010. There are 19 streets.

Geography 
Zayar is located 9 km southeast of Srednyaya Akhtuba (the district's administrative centre) by road. Kalinina is the nearest rural locality.

References 

Rural localities in Sredneakhtubinsky District